Desirée Goyette-Bogas (née Goyette; September 10, 1956) is an American singer, composer, lyricist and voice-over artist. She has been nominated for two Grammy Awards and has voiced such characters as Betty Boop, Barbie, Nermal, Petunia Pig, Honey Bunny and numerous others for radio, television and toys.

Biography
Desiree Goyette graduated from the San Francisco Conservatory of Music and also studied at San Jose State University in the music department. She lived in Los Angeles for numerous years and wed her second husband, producer of Peanuts and Garfield TV specials, Lee Mendelson. After many years together they then separated and divorced. Around 1993, Goyette married fellow Peanuts and Garfield music contributor Ed Bogas, to whom she is still married to and whom she had twins named Benjamin and Lily (born 2002).

On the first three seasons of Garfield and Friends, Goyette co-wrote all of her songs for the Garfield segments with future husband Ed Bogas. She also contributed her voice to several songs and characters on the show, most notably Nermal. She also teamed with Joey Scarbury for the song, "Flashbeagle" for It's Flashbeagle, Charlie Brown. Goyette writes and records inspirational albums with her company Lightchild Publishing. Three of her works—"I am the Lord" (based on Isaiah 45:5–6), a new setting of Mary Baker Eddy's Communion Hymn, and an arrangement of the South African folk hymn Siyahamba—are included in the 2008 Christian Science Hymnal Supplement.

Works

Television
Lou Rawls Parade of Stars (1980) as herself
No Man's Valley (1981): voice of Pat the Passenger Pigeon
The New You Asked for It Show (1981): co-host with Rich Little
Here Comes Garfield (1982): composer, singer
It's an Adventure, Charlie Brown (1983): composer
Garfield on the Town (1983): composer, singer, voice of Girl Cat 1
The Charlie Brown and Snoopy Show (1983, 1985): composer
It's Flashbeagle, Charlie Brown (1984): composer, lyricist, singer
Garfield in the Rough (1984): composer, lyricist, singer, voices of Girl Cats
The Romance of Betty Boop (1985): composer, lyricist, voice of Betty Boop
Garfield's Halloween Adventure (1985): composer, lyricist, voice of Woman at Door
You're a Good Man, Charlie Brown (1985): associate producer, musical director
Jem (1985–1988): voice of Danse
Happy New Year, Charlie Brown! (1986): composer, singer ("Slow Slow Quick Quick")
Garfield in Paradise (1986): composer, voice of Owooda
Wrinkles: In Need of Cuddles (1986): composer, associate director, voice of Mama
Garfield Goes Hollywood (1987): composer, voice of Desirée the Classical Cat
Garfield and Friends (1988–1990): composer, voice of Nermal, Mother turtle, Mariah, Natalie, Chloe, and others
Cathy (1987): voice of Brenda
A Garfield Christmas Special (1987): composer, singer
Snoopy: The Musical (1988): musical director
Garfield: His 9 Lives (1988): composer, voice of Chloe and Sara
This Is America, Charlie Brown (1988): music director, composer, singer in the segment "The Music and Heroes of America"
Garfield's Thanksgiving (1989): composer
Garfield's Babes and Bullets (1989): composer, voice of Tanya
You Don't Look 40, Charlie Brown (1990) as herself
Garfield Gets a Life (1991): composer
Tiny Toon Adventures (1992): voice of Roxy and Bird Toon
Animaniacs (1996): voice of Googi Goop
A Lot in Common (2004): composer

Other
Am I Cool or What? (1991): singer, "Up on a Fence"
The Nuttiest Nutcracker (1999): voice of Sparkle
The Little Mermaid II: Return to the Sea (2000): singer on "Down to the Sea"
Soulcalibur II (2002): voice of Taki
Zone of the Enders: The 2nd Runner (2003): voice of Angie
Airforce Delta Strike (2004): voice of Ellen McNichol/Collette Le Clerc

References

External links

1956 births
Living people
Place of birth missing (living people)
American women pop singers
American television composers
American video game actresses
American voice actresses
San Francisco Conservatory of Music alumni
Singers from California
20th-century American actresses
20th-century American singers
21st-century American actresses
21st-century American singers
20th-century American women singers
20th-century American composers
21st-century American women singers
20th-century women composers